Springtime is a 1920 American silent comedy film starring Oliver Hardy.

Cast
 Jimmy Aubrey - The park cleaner
 Dixie Lamont - The maid
 Oliver Hardy - The Commissioner (as Babe Hardy)
 Evelyn Nelson - His daughter

See also
 List of American films of 1920
 Oliver Hardy filmography

External links

1920 films
American silent short films
American black-and-white films
1920 comedy films
1920 short films
Films directed by Jess Robbins
Silent American comedy films
American comedy short films
1920s American films